Hypotrix ferricola is a moth of the family Noctuidae first described by Smith in 1905. It is found in southern North America from south-eastern Arizona, south-western New Mexico and northern Mexico.

Most records are from ponderosa pine forests.

Adults are on wing from early April to early August possibly representing several generations.

External links
"A revision of the genus Hypotrix Guenée in North America with descriptions of four new species and a new genus (Lepidoptera, Noctuidae, Noctuinae, Eriopygini)"

Hypotrix
Moths described in 1905